Wang Ginn-wang or Wang Jinn-wang (born 14 October 1947) is a Taiwanese politician. He was the Minister of the Coast Guard Administration from 2006 to 2014.

ROC Coast Guard Administration Ministry

Clash between Taiwanese boats and Japan Coast Guard
On 25 September 2012, when dozens of fishing boats entered Japanese territorial water en route to the Diaoyutai Islands, Japan Coast Guard patrol boats fired water cannon at the fishing boats. Wang of the Coast Guard Administration (CGA) ships responded: "We do not rule out using force to fight back if Japan were to do so".

Diaoyutai Islands fishery water

After signing the historic fishery agreement between ROC and Japan on 10 April 2013, Wang said that any fishing boat entering the Senkaku Islands (or from Mandarin Chinese, Diaoyutai Islands) water within 12 nautical miles from outside Taiwan will be expelled, including the Japanese fishing boats. This triggered anger from Mainland China.

Awards
 : Order of Propitious Clouds with Grand Cordon (2015)

References

1947 births
Living people
Government ministers of Taiwan
Central Police University alumni
Taiwanese police officers
Recipients of the Order of Propitious Clouds